"Turn It Up" is the lead single from English singer Peter Andre's second studio album, Natural (1996). The single was released on 29 May 1995 through Mushroom. It was Andre's first single to be released in the United Kingdom, peaking at number 64 on the UK Singles Chart. The song features an uncredited rap from co-writer and producer Ollie Jacobs.

Track listings
UK CD single
 "Turn It Up"
 "Turn It Up" (extended mix)
 "Drive Me Crazy"

UK 7-inch and cassette single
 "Turn It Up"
 "Drive Me Crazy"

Charts

References

1995 singles
1995 songs
Peter Andre songs
Mushroom Records singles
Songs written by Ollie Jacobs
Songs written by Peter Andre